Local elections were held in  Marilao, Bulacan on May 13, 2019 as part of the Philippine general election. Voting was held to fill the following municipal positions: the mayor, vice mayor, and eight councilors.

Background

Incumbent mayor Tito Santiago did not run for re-election on his seat, but he nominated former ABC Marilao president Ricardo Silvestre of Patubig who ran under the PDP–Laban. His main opponent was a mayor aspirant, Atty. Jem Sy, who is also an actress and president of the Jemina Sy Foundation, from Santa Rosa I. Independent runners are the former vice mayor Andre Santos of Poblacion II, who is arrested last December after the standoff in his home, and perennial candidates Jojo Atienza and Ruperto "JM-Jun" Montaos, who is running under the PFP.

Results

Mayor
Mayor Tito Santiago is not running, but his party nominates former ABC president Ricky Silvestre.

Electoral protest
On July 22, 2019, the Regional Trial Court Branch 21 in Malolos dismissed Atty. Jem Sy's electoral protest against incumbent mayor-elect Ricky Silvestre. It cited the principle of the Supreme Court in the case of Sy v. Marcias in 2010, that “a protest attacking all the precincts is reminiscent of a petition for failure of elections and not an election protest", in regards to the former contesting the results of 104 clustered precincts in Marilao.

Vice Mayor
Incumbent Vice Mayor Henry Lutao is running for reelection as Vice Mayor, his opponents are Former Abangan Sur Barangay Captain Romell Pabale and Zaldy Marcelo.

Sangguniang Bayan election
Election is via plurality-at-large voting: A voter votes for up to eight candidates, then the eight candidates with the highest number of votes are elected.

Councilor Bob dela Cruz is term-limited, so his brother Jayson will run for his seat; councilor Willie Diaz is also term-limited, while incumbent Luisa Silvestre is not seeking re-election. Councilors Irma Celones, Deby Espiritu-Reyes, Mark Guillermo and Arnold Papa will run for their third and final terms, while Ariel Amador, losing the 2013 elections, will run for his second term.

|-bgcolor=black
|colspan=25|

References

2019 Philippine local elections
Elections in Marilao
May 2019 events in the Philippines
2019 elections in Central Luzon